Tris(oxazolinyl)borate compounds are a class of tridentate ligands; often abbreviated ToR, where R is the substituent on the oxazoline ring. Most commonly the substituent is either a methyl, propyl, tert-butyl or hydrogen. 
The formation of anionic boron backbone with addition of a phenyl group on boron allows the ligand to strongly bind to the metal center. It results in a more robust complex.
  
Tris(oxazolinyl)borates can be characterised as scorpionate ligands and may be compared to tris(pyrazolyl)borate and trisoxazoline ligands. In bulky pyrazolylborate (Tp) derivatives, isomerization may occur via 1,2-shifts; additionally B–N bond cleavage is a common decomposition pathways for the Tp ligands. The oxazoline-based ligands with B-C linkages avoid these decomposition problems.

Synthesis

The first example of a trisoxazolinylborate ligand was tris(4,4-dimethyl-2-oxazolinyl)phenyl borate (ToM). This was prepared by a reaction of dichlorophenylborane with 3 equivalents of 2-lithio-4,4-dimethyl-2-oxazolide.
Later variants, such as tris(4S-isopropyl-2-oxazolinyl)phenylborate (ToP) have been prepared in an analogous manner.

 PhBCl2 + 3 Li(Oxaz-Me2) → PhB(Oxaz-Me2)3 + 3 LiCl

Complexes of ToR
The first coordination complexes made using ToM ligands were based around zirconium (IV), as the sterically bulky ligands were able to stabilise the highly reactive metal centers. ToMZr(IV) complexes were prepared by salt metathesis using LiToM and TlToM and ZrCl4. The formed complex ToMZrCl3 was found to be quite robust and showed C3V symmetry in both solution and solid state.

Lithium tris(4,4-dimethyl-2-oxazolin-2-yl) phenyl borate (LiToM) is used as a transfer agent. However TlToM frequently is as a more effective transfer agent than LiToM because of the higher solubility of the Tl salt and the insolubility of thallium chloride by-products. In contrast, lithium halide byproducts from preparations employing LiToM can cause purification problems.

Another example for the coordinating chemistry of ToM is the formation of ToMMgMe by the reaction of equimolar amounts of HToM and MgMe2(O2C4H8)2. In addition, the reaction of two equivalents of HToM with MgMe2(O2C4H8)2 gives the homoleptic ToM2Mg compound. This compound can also be obtained by the reaction between one equivalent of HToM and ToMMgMe revealing that Mg in ToMMgMe is an active center for the chemical reactions. According to 1H NMR spectroscopic data, ToM2Mg shows Cs symmetry. In these reactions HToM is used as the transfer agent.
Coordination chemistry of iridium(I) centers with ToP has been shown by the preparation of [Ir(ToP)(COD)] (COD =1,5-C8H12) by the reaction of LiToP and 0.5 equivalent of [Ir(μ-Cl)(COD)]2.

Catalysis
ToMMgMe is an effective precatalyst for the cross-dehydrocoupling of Si-H bonds in organosilanes and N-H bonds in amines to give Si-N bonds and H2. Furthermore, tris(oxazolinyl)borate yttrium alkyl and amide compounds (ToMYR2) can be used as precatalysts for the cyclization of aminoalkenes.

See also
 Trisoxazolines
 Trispyrazolylborate

References

Ligands